The Total Africa Futsal Cup of Nations (previously known as the African Futsal Championship) is the main national futsal competition of the Confederation of African Football nations. It was first held in 1996 and has been played every four years. It is a qualification to FIFA Futsal World Cup.

On 6 August 2015, the CAF Executive Committee decided to change the name of the tournament from the African Futsal Championship to the Africa Futsal Cup of Nations, similar to the football's version, Africa Cup of Nations.

History
The first edition took place in 1996, which witnessed Egypt claiming the first continental title. Egypt went on to dominate winning three consecutive title before losing the 2008 final to Libya.

In the 6th edition, Morocco won the title for the first time after defeating Egypt 3–2 in the final. On 7 February 2020, Morocco defeated Egypt 5–0 in the 2020 final, becoming the second nation after Egypt to win back-to-back titles.

Results

 A round-robin tournament determined the final standings.
 The 2011 tournament was cancelled. To determine the three African qualifiers to the 2012 FIFA Futsal World Cup, a separate qualification tournament was held, with Egypt, Libya and Morocco qualifying.

Performance by nations

* = hosts

Medals

Participating nations

Legend
 — Champions
 — Runners-up
 — Third place
 — Fourth place
 — Semifinals
5th — 5th place
R1 — Round 1
Q — Qualified for upcoming tournament
 ×  – Did not enter
 •  – Did not qualify
 ×  – Withdrew before qualification
 ••  – Withdrew before or during tournament
     – To be determined
 — Hosts

Summary (1996-2020)

FIFA Futsal World Cup Qualifiers
Legend
1st – Champions
2nd – Runners-up
3rd – Third place
4th – Fourth place
QF – Quarterfinals
R2 – Round 2 (1989–2008, second group stage, top 8; 2012–present: knockout round of 16)
R1 – Round 1
     – Hosts

Q – Qualified for upcoming tournament

Sponsorship 
In July 2016, Total has secured an eight-year sponsorship package from the Confederation of African Football (CAF) to support 10 of its principal competitions. Due to this sponsorship, the Africa Futsal Cup of Nations is named "Total Africa Futsal Cup of Nations".

References

External links
CAF futsal - cafonline.com
African Futsal Championship Overview - rsssf.com

 
Confederation of African Football competitions for national teams
International futsal competitions
Futsal competitions in Africa
African championships
Recurring sporting events established in 1996